Kheralu is one of the 182 Legislative Assembly constituencies of Gujarat state in India. It is part of Mahesana district. It is numbered as 20-Kheralu.

List of segments

This assembly seat represents the following segments:

 Satlasana Taluka
 Kheralu Taluka
 Vadnagar Taluka (Part) Villages – Sipor, Karshanpura, Khatasana, Dabu, Aspa, Vaktapur, Ganeshpura, Undani, Khanpur, Sarna, Champa, Navapura, Sultanpur, Shahpur (Vad), Undhai, Valasana, Vaghdi (Juni), Vaghadi (Navi), Shobhasan, Pipaldar, Karbatiya, Sabalpur, Rajpur (Vad), Mirzapur.

Members of Legislative Assembly

Election results

2022 
 

-->

2019 Bypoll

2017

2012

See also
 List of constituencies of the Gujarat Legislative Assembly
 Mahesana district

References

External links
 

Assembly constituencies of Gujarat
Mehsana district